The 2003 Toronto Blue Jays season was the franchise's 27th season of Major League Baseball. It resulted in the Blue Jays finishing third in the American League East with a record of 86 wins and 76 losses. It was the team's final season with Diamond as one of the mascots, as she was removed at the end of the season, leaving Ace as the sole mascot of the Blue Jays.

Offseason
October 9, 2002: Chris Carpenter was released by the Toronto Blue Jays.
October 9, 2002: Brandon Lyon was selected off waivers by the Boston Red Sox from the Toronto Blue Jays.
October 23, 2002: Doug Linton was signed as a free agent with the Toronto Blue Jays.
December 15, 2002: Felipe López was traded as part of a 4-team trade by the Toronto Blue Jays to the Cincinnati Reds. The Oakland Athletics sent a player to be named later to the Toronto Blue Jays. The Arizona Diamondbacks sent Erubiel Durazo to the Oakland Athletics. The Cincinnati Reds sent Elmer Dessens and cash to the Arizona Diamondbacks. The Oakland Athletics sent Jason Arnold (minors) (December 16, 2002) to the Toronto Blue Jays to complete the trade.
December 20, 2002: Mike Bordick was signed as a free agent with the Toronto Blue Jays.
December 28, 2002: Frank Catalanotto was signed as a free agent with the Toronto Blue Jays.
January 27, 2003: John Ford Griffin was traded by the Oakland Athletics to the Toronto Blue Jays for a player to be named later. The Toronto Blue Jays sent Jason Perry (minors) (June 23, 2003) to the Oakland Athletics to complete the trade.

Regular season

Summary
The 2003 season was a surprise to both team management and baseball analysts. After a poor April, the team had its most successful month ever in May. The offense was mainly responsible for the stunning turnaround. Delgado took over the major league lead in runs batted in, followed closely by Wells. The middle infield positions remained a gametime decision – Bordick played shortstop and third base, Dave Berg second base and third base, Chris Woodward shortstop and Orlando Hudson second base. Minor league call-up Howie Clark entered the mix as a utility player after Hinske underwent surgery to repair a broken hamate bone in his right hand, which he had tried to play through for the first six weeks.

Despite their hitting successes, poor pitching continued to plague the team. Roy Halladay was spectacular in winning his first Cy Young Award, going 22–7, with a 3.25 ERA, but he didn't get much help from his fellow pitchers, although he had a poor start himself. Rookie Aquilino López was a pleasant surprise out of the bullpen. Kelvim Escobar and former NBA player Mark Hendrickson were inserted into the rotation with their places in the bullpen filled by waiver acquisitions Doug Davis and Josh Towers, who went 8–1 after being called up from Triple-A Syracuse. The closer role was a season-long revolving door, with nobody able to take hold of the reins. Trade speculation had focussed on the acquisitions of pitching at the expense of hitters, but in the end the team simply divested itself of impending free agent Shannon Stewart without getting a pitcher in return. Instead Bobby Kielty, another outfielder with a much lower batting average than Stewart's, was obtained from the Minnesota Twins and later traded in November 2003 to the Oakland Athletics for starter Ted Lilly. The top four pitchers for the projected 2004 rotation would include Halladay, Lilly, free agent Miguel Batista, and the return of Pat Hentgen.

After the spectacular turnaround in May 2003, which helped the team move to just few games behind the wildcard leading Boston Red Sox, team performance slowly returned to reality, as predicted by team management. Carlos Delgado was second in the voting for the American League MVP Award, although the Jays were in third place in their division. The Jays also announced that a new logo, and new uniforms, would be used as of January 1, 2004.

Opening Day starters
Frank Catalanotto
Carlos Delgado
Roy Halladay
Eric Hinske
Ken Huckaby
Orlando Hudson
Josh Phelps
Shannon Stewart
Vernon Wells
Chris Woodward

Season standings

Record vs. opponents

Notable transactions
June 3, 2003: Aaron Hill was drafted by the Toronto Blue Jays in the 1st round (13th pick) of the 2003 amateur draft. Player signed June 17, 2003.
June 16, 2003: Scott Service was selected off waivers by the Toronto Blue Jays from the Arizona Diamondbacks.
July 16, 2003: Bobby Kielty was traded by the Minnesota Twins to the Toronto Blue Jays for a player to be named later and Shannon Stewart. The Toronto Blue Jays sent Dave Gassner (December 15, 2003) to the Minnesota Twins to complete the trade.
August 10, 2003: Scott Service was released by the Toronto Blue Jays.

2003 Draft picks
Source 

The 2003 MLB draft was held on June 3–4.

Roster

Game log

|- align="center" bgcolor="ffbbbb"
| 1 || March 31 || Yankees || 8 – 4 || Clemens (1-0) || Halladay (0-1) || || 50,119 || 0-1
|-

|- align="center" bgcolor="ffbbbb"
| 2 || April 1 || Yankees || 10 – 1 || Pettitte (1-0) || Lidle (0-1) || || 15,176 || 0-2
|- align="center" bgcolor="ffbbbb"
| 3 || April 2 || Yankees || 9 – 7 || Mussina (1-0) || Hendrickson (0-1) || Acevedo (1) || 16,222 || 0-3
|- align="center" bgcolor="bbffbb"
| 4 || April 4 || @ Twins || 7 – 2 || Sturtze (1-0) || Reed (0-1) || || 48,617 || 1-3
|- align="center" bgcolor="bbffbb"
| 5 || April 5 || @ Twins || 4 – 3 (11) || Walker (1-0) || Guardado (0-1) || Escobar (1) || 31,421 || 2-3
|- align="center" bgcolor="bbffbb"
| 6 || April 6 || @ Twins || 8 – 1 || Lidle (1-1) || Radke (1-1) || || 23,549 || 3-3
|- align="center" bgcolor="bbffbb"
| 7 || April 8 || Red Sox || 8 – 4 || Hendrickson (1-1) || Lowe (1-1) || || 13,147 || 4-3
|- align="center" bgcolor="bbffbb"
| 8 || April 9 || Red Sox || 10 – 5 || Sturtze (2-0) || Fossum (1-1) || || 13,099 || 5-3
|- align="center" bgcolor="ffbbbb"
| 9 || April 10 || Red Sox || 8 – 7 || Timlin (1-0) || Politte (0-1) || || 13,779 || 5-4
|- align="center" bgcolor="ffbbbb"
| 10 || April 11 || Twins || 6 – 4 || Rogers (1-0) || Lidle (1-2) || Guardado (3) || 13,237 || 5-5
|- align="center" bgcolor="ffbbbb"
| 11 || April 12 || Twins || 9 – 6 || Hawkins (1-0) || Escobar (0-1) || Guardado (4) || 14,118 || 5-6
|- align="center" bgcolor="ffbbbb"
| 12 || April 13 || Twins || 9 – 3 || Mays (2-1) || Hendrickson (1-2) || || 13,333 || 5-7
|- align="center" bgcolor="ffbbbb"
| 13 || April 14 || @ Yankees || 10 – 9 || Contreras (1-0) || López (0-1) || Hammond (1) || 30,761 || 5-8
|- align="center" bgcolor="ffbbbb"
| 14 || April 15 || @ Yankees || 5 – 0 || Mussina (3-0) || Halladay (0-2) || || 33,833 || 5-9
|- align="center" bgcolor="bbffbb"
| 15 || April 16 || @ Yankees || 7 – 6 || Lidle (2-2) || Hitchcock (0-1) || Escobar (2) || 25,831 || 6-9
|- align="center" bgcolor="ffbbbb"
| 16 || April 17 || @ Yankees || 4 – 0 || Weaver (1-0) || Walker (1-1) || || 32,057 || 6-10
|- align="center" bgcolor="ffbbbb"
| 17 || April 18 || @ Red Sox || 7 – 3 || Wakefield (2-0) || Tam (0-1) || || 31,440 || 6-11
|- align="center" bgcolor="ffbbbb"
| 18 || April 19 || @ Red Sox || 7 – 2 || Lowe (3-1) || Sturtze (2-1) || || 32,329 || 6-12
|- align="center" bgcolor="ffbbbb"
| 19 || April 20 || @ Red Sox || 6 – 5 || Timlin (3-0) || Politte (0-2) || || 29,579 || 6-13
|- align="center" bgcolor="bbffbb"
| 20 || April 21 || @ Red Sox || 11 – 6 || Lidle (3-2) || Burkett (1-1) || || 34,370 || 7-13
|- align="center" bgcolor="ffbbbb"
| 21 || April 22 || @ Devil Rays || 4 – 3 || Kennedy (1-1) || Kershner (0-1) || Carter (2) || 10,013 || 7-14
|- align="center" bgcolor="ffbbbb"
| 22 || April 23 || @ Devil Rays || 4 – 3 || Venafro (1-0) || Hendrickson (1-3) || Carter (3) || 9,221 || 7-15
|- align="center" bgcolor="bbffbb"
| 23 || April 24 || @ Devil Rays || 5 – 3 || Sturtze (3-1) || Sosa (1-2) || Escobar (3) || 8,618 || 8-15
|- align="center" bgcolor="bbffbb"
| 24 || April 25 || Royals || 6 – 5 || Escobar (1-1) || Carrasco (1-1) || || 16,417 || 9-15
|- align="center" bgcolor="ffbbbb"
| 25 || April 26 || Royals || 9 – 6 || Grimsley (1-1) || Tam (0-2) || MacDougal (10) || 17,197 || 9-16
|- align="center" bgcolor="bbffbb"
| 26 || April 27 || Royals || 10 – 9 || Politte (1-2) || MacDougal (1-1) || || 17,059 || 10-16
|- align="center" bgcolor="ffbbbb"
| 27 || April 29 || Rangers || 16 – 11 || Thomson (2-2) || Hendrickson (1-4) || Cordero (1) || 48,097 || 10-17
|- align="center" bgcolor="ffbbbb"
| 28 || April 30 || Rangers || 11 – 3 || Drese (2-1) || Sturtze (3-2) || || 16,021 || 10-18
|-

|- align="center" bgcolor="bbffbb"
| 29 || May 1 || Rangers || 7 – 6 || Halladay (1-2) || Lewis (3-2) || Politte (1) || 16,111 || 11-18
|- align="center" bgcolor="bbffbb"
| 30 || May 2 || Angels || 3 – 1 || Lidle (4-2) || Lackey (1-3) || || 17,799 || 12-18
|- align="center" bgcolor="bbffbb"
| 31 || May 3 || Angels || 7 – 1 || Davis (1-0) || Shields (1-1) || || 21,007 || 13-18
|- align="center" bgcolor="bbffbb"
| 32 || May 4 || Angels || 8 – 2 || Hendrickson (2-4) || Ortiz (4-3) || Escobar (4) || 21,513 || 14-18
|- align="center" bgcolor="bbffbb"
| 33 || May 6 || @ Rangers || 15 – 5 || Halladay (2-2) || Lewis (3-3) || || 20,092 || 15-18
|- align="center" bgcolor="ffbbbb"
| 34 || May 7 || @ Rangers || 5 – 4 || Fultz (1-0) || Sturtze (3-3) || Urbina (10) || 18,508 || 15-19
|- align="center" bgcolor="bbffbb"
| 35 || May 8 || @ Rangers || 8 – 6 || Lidle (5-2) || Drese (2-2) || Politte (2) || 20,177 || 16-19
|- align="center" bgcolor="ffbbbb"
| 36 || May 9 || @ Angels || 6 – 1 || Sele (1-0) || Davis (1-1) || || 42,820 || 16-20
|- align="center" bgcolor="bbffbb"
| 37 || May 10 || @ Angels || 7 – 4 || Hendrickson (3-4) || Ortiz (4-4) || || 43,661 || 17-20
|- align="center" bgcolor="bbffbb"
| 38 || May 11 || @ Angels || 4 – 2 || Halladay (3-2) || Washburn (3-4) || Politte (3) || 32,129 || 18-20
|- align="center" bgcolor="ffbbbb"
| 39 || May 13 || Devil Rays || 7 – 5 || Kennedy (3-3) || Sturtze (3-4) || Carter (8) || 14,007 || 18-21
|- align="center" bgcolor="bbffbb"
| 40 || May 14 || Devil Rays || 7 – 6 || Lidle (6-2) || Brazelton (0-2) || Politte (4) || 29,013 || 19-21
|- align="center" bgcolor="ffbbbb"
| 41 || May 15 || Devil Rays || 9 – 5 || Colomé (1-1) || Davis (1-2) || || 20,417 || 19-22
|- align="center" bgcolor="bbffbb"
| 42 || May 16 || @ Royals || 18 – 1 || Hendrickson (4-4) || George (4-3) || || 24,167 || 20-22
|- align="center" bgcolor="bbffbb"
| 43 || May 17 || @ Royals || 7 – 4 || Halladay (4-2) || Grimsley (1-3) || Politte (5) || 25,032 || 21-22
|- align="center" bgcolor="bbffbb"
| 44 || May 18 || @ Royals || 4 – 3 || Sturtze (4-4) || Snyder (0-1) || Politte (6) || 15,462 || 22-22
|- align="center" bgcolor="bbffbb"
| 45 || May 19 || @ White Sox || 12 – 2 || Lidle (7-2) || Wright (0-2) || || 19,628 || 23-22
|- align="center" bgcolor="ffbbbb"
| 46 || May 20 || @ White Sox || 4 – 1 || Colón (5-3) || Davis (1-3) || || 12,857 || 23-23
|- align="center" bgcolor="ffbbbb"
| 47 || May 21 || @ White Sox || 6 – 5 || Marte (2-0) || Politte (1-3) || Koch (5) || 13,076 || 23-24
|- align="center" bgcolor="bbffbb"
| 48 || May 22 || @ Yankees || 8 – 3 || Halladay (5-2) || Pettitte (4-5) || || 45,777 || 24-24
|- align="center" bgcolor="bbffbb"
| 49 || May 23 || @ Yankees || 6 – 2 || Escobar (2-1) || Mussina (7-3) || || 34,134 || 25-24
|- align="center" bgcolor="bbffbb"
| 50 || May 24 || @ Yankees || 5 – 2 || Lidle (8-2) || Wells (6-2) || Politte (7) || 35,023 || 26-24
|- align="center" bgcolor="bbffbb"
| 51 || May 25 || @ Yankees || 5 – 3 || Davis (2-3) || Weaver (3-3) || Politte (8) || 40,940 || 27-24
|- align="center" bgcolor="bbffbb"
| 52 || May 26 || White Sox || 11 – 5 || Towers (1-0) || Buehrle (2-8) || Tam (1) || 19,009 || 28-24
|- align="center" bgcolor="bbffbb"
| 53 || May 27 || White Sox || 5 – 1 || Halladay (6-2) || Colón (5-4) || || 19,365 || 29-24
|- align="center" bgcolor="ffbbbb"
| 54 || May 28 || White Sox || 8 – 0 || Garland (3-4) || Escobar (2-2) || || 36,806 || 29-25
|- align="center" bgcolor="ffbbbb"
| 55 || May 29 || White Sox || 3 – 2 || Loaiza (8-2) || Lidle (8-3) || Koch (6) || 20,010 || 29-26
|- align="center" bgcolor="bbffbb"
| 56 || May 30 || Red Sox || 13 – 2 || Davis (3-3) || Burkett (3-3) || || 21,381 || 30-26
|- align="center" bgcolor="bbffbb"
| 57 || May 31 || Red Sox || 10 – 7 || Sturtze (5-4) || Fossum (4-4) || Politte (9) || 28,809 || 31-26
|-

|- align="center" bgcolor="bbffbb"
| 58 || June 1 || Red Sox || 11 – 8 || Halladay (7-2) || White (0-1) || || 26,890 || 32-26
|- align="center" bgcolor="ffbbbb"
| 59 || June 3 || @ Cardinals || 11 – 5 || Morris (7-3) || Escobar (2-3) || || 28,907 || 32-27
|- align="center" bgcolor="ffbbbb"
| 60 || June 4 || @ Cardinals || 8 – 5 || Simontacchi (3-3) || Lidle (8-4) || Eldred (5) || 28,840 || 32-28
|- align="center" bgcolor="ffbbbb"
| 61 || June 5 || @ Cardinals || 13 – 5 || Williams (8-1) || Hendrickson (4-5) || || 33,729 || 32-29
|- align="center" bgcolor="bbffbb"
| 62 || June 6 || @ Reds || 9 – 2 || Halladay (8-2) || Riedling (0-3) || || 28,281 || 33-29
|- align="center" bgcolor="ffbbbb"
| 63 || June 7 || @ Reds || 9 – 8 || Reitsma (5-2) || Politte (1-4) || || 30,158 || 33-30
|- align="center" bgcolor="bbffbb"
| 64 || June 8 || @ Reds || 5 – 0 || Escobar (3-3) || Haynes (0-5) || || 25,633 || 34-30
|- align="center" bgcolor="bbffbb"
| 65 || June 10 || Pirates || 13 – 8 || Lidle (9-4) || Benson (5-7) || || 14,090 || 35-30
|- align="center" bgcolor="bbffbb"
| 66 || June 11 || Pirates || 8 – 5 || Halladay (9-2) || D'Amico (4-7) || || 32,036 || 36-30
|- align="center" bgcolor="bbffbb"
| 67 || June 12 || Pirates || 5 – 4 || Hendrickson (5-5) || Suppan (5-6) || Politte (10) || 15,015 || 37-30
|- align="center" bgcolor="bbffbb"
| 68 || June 13 || Cubs || 5 – 1 || Escobar (4-3) || Wood (5-5) || || 23,018 || 38-30
|- align="center" bgcolor="ffbbbb"
| 69 || June 14 || Cubs || 4 – 2 || Prior (8-2) || Davis (3-4) || Borowski (13) || 33,167 || 38-31
|- align="center" bgcolor="bbffbb"
| 70 || June 15 || Cubs || 5 – 4 (10)|| López (1-1) || Guthrie (0-3) || || 34,221 || 39-31
|- align="center" bgcolor=#bbbbbb
| -- || June 17 || @ Orioles ||colspan=6|Postponed (rain) Rescheduled for July 3
|- align="center" bgcolor="bbffbb"
| 71 || June 18 || @ Orioles || 6 – 2 || Halladay (10-2) || Daal (4-8) || López (1) || 28,828 || 40-31
|- align="center" bgcolor="bbffbb"
| 72 || June 19 || @ Orioles || 6 – 1 || Escobar (5-3) || Helling (4-5) || || 24,218 || 41-31
|- align="center" bgcolor="bbffbb"
| 73 || June 20 || @ Expos || 8 – 4 || Lidle (10-4) || Vázquez (6-5) || || 11,355 || 42-31
|- align="center" bgcolor="ffbbbb"
| 74 || June 21 || @ Expos || 8 – 5 || Ayala (6-2) || Politte (1-5) || Biddle (19) || 11,483 || 42-32
|- align="center" bgcolor="bbffbb"
| 75 || June 22 || @ Expos || 4 – 2 || Halladay (11-2) || Hernández (6-6) || Politte (11) || 15,508 || 43-32
|- align="center" bgcolor="bbffbb"
| 76 || June 23 || Orioles || 13 – 4 || Davis (4-4) || Daal (4-9) || || 17,555 || 44-32
|- align="center" bgcolor="ffbbbb"
| 77 || June 24 || Orioles || 6 – 4 || Helling (5-5) || Escobar (5-4) || Julio (16) || 17,425 || 44-33
|- align="center" bgcolor="ffbbbb"
| 78 || June 25 || Orioles || 9 – 2 || Ponson (10-4) || Lidle (10-5) || || 37,248 || 44-34
|- align="center" bgcolor="bbffbb"
| 79 || June 26 || Orioles || 13 – 8 || Sturtze (6-4) || Driskill (1-3) || López (2) || 19,098 || 45-34
|- align="center" bgcolor="bbffbb"
| 80 || June 27 || Expos || 6 – 5 || Miller (1-0) || Manon (0-1) || || 24,024 || 46-34
|- align="center" bgcolor="ffbbbb"
| 81 || June 28 || Expos || 4 – 2 || Vargas (5-3) || Davis (4-5) || Biddle (22) || 33,334 || 46-35
|- align="center" bgcolor="ffbbbb"
| 82 || June 29 || Expos || 10 – 2 || Ohka (7-7) || Escobar (5-5) || || 37,354 || 46-36
|- align="center" bgcolor="ffbbbb"
| 83 || June 30 || @ Tigers || 6 – 2 || Maroth (3-12) || Lidle (10-6) || || 13,353 || 46-37
|-

|- align="center" bgcolor="ffbbbb"
| 84 || July 1 || @ Tigers || 5 – 0 || Roney (1-2) || Hendrickson (5-6) || Walker (1) || 15,448 || 46-38
|- align="center" bgcolor="bbffbb"
| 85 || July 2 || @ Tigers || 8 – 2 || Halladay (12-2) || Bernero (1-12) || || 16,052 || 47-38
|- align="center" bgcolor="ffbbbb"
| 86 || July 3 || @ Orioles || 6 – 5 || Johnson (7-3) || Davis (4-6) || Julio (17) || 27,022 || 47-39
|- align="center" bgcolor="ffbbbb"
| 87 || July 4 || @ Orioles || 8 – 5 || Driskill (2-3) || López (1-2) || Julio (18) || 25,641 || 47-40
|- align="center" bgcolor="ffbbbb"
| 88 || July 5 || @ Orioles || 9 – 2 || Ponson (11-5) || Lidle (10-7) || || 29,859 || 47-41
|- align="center" bgcolor="bbffbb"
| 89 || July 6 || @ Orioles || 5 – 3 (10)|| Acevedo (1-3) || Ligtenberg (0-1) || || 30,284 || 48-41
|- align="center" bgcolor="ffbbbb"
| 90 || July 8 || Red Sox || 2 – 1 (12)|| Jones (1-0) || Tam (0-3) || Kim (2) || 20,022 || 48-42
|- align="center" bgcolor="ffbbbb"
| 91 || July 9 || Red Sox || 8 – 7 || Lyon (4-5) || Tam (0-4) || Kim (3) || 23,551 || 48-43
|- align="center" bgcolor="ffbbbb"
| 92 || July 10 || Red Sox || 7 – 1 || Mendoza (3-3) || Lidle (10-8) || || 20,113 || 48-44
|- align="center" bgcolor="ffbbbb"
| 93 || July 11 || Yankees || 8 – 5 || Pettitte (11-6) || Miller (1-1) || Rivera (16) || 27,652 || 48-45
|- align="center" bgcolor="bbffbb"
| 94 || July 12 || Yankees || 10 – 3 || Halladay (13-2) || Mussina (10-6) || || 37,119 || 49-45
|- align="center" bgcolor="ffbbbb"
| 95 || July 13 || Yankees || 6 – 2 || Weaver (5-7) || Escobar (5-6) || || 32,664 || 49-46
|- align="center" bgcolor="bbffbb"
| 96 || July 17 || @ Red Sox || 5 – 2 || Halladay (14-2) || Lowe (10-4) || || 34,521 || 50-46
|- align="center" bgcolor="bbffbb"
| 97 || July 18 || @ Red Sox || 4 – 1 || Escobar (6-6) || Wakefield (6-5) || Miller (1) || 34,136 || 51-46
|- align="center" bgcolor="ffbbbb"
| 98 || July 19 || @ Red Sox || 5 – 4 (10)|| Kim (3-2) || López (1-3) || || 34,812 || 51-47
|- align="center" bgcolor="ffbbbb"
| 99 || July 20 || @ Red Sox || 9 – 4 || Martínez (7-2) || Wasdin (0-1) || || 34,321 || 51-48
|- align="center" bgcolor="bbffbb"
| 100 || July 21 || @ Yankees || 8 – 0 (8)|| Hendrickson (6-6) || Weaver (5-8) || || 51,958 || 52-48
|- align="center" bgcolor=#bbbbbb
| -- || July 22 || @ Yankees ||colspan=6|Postponed (rain) Rescheduled for September 8
|- align="center" bgcolor="ffbbbb"
| 101 || July 23 || White Sox || 7 – 6 || White (1-1) || Acevedo (1-4) || Marte (7) || 20,320 || 52-49
|- align="center" bgcolor="ffbbbb"
| 102 || July 24 || White Sox || 4 – 3 (13)|| Gordon (5-5) || Sturtze (6-5) || White (1) || 18,438 || 52-50
|- align="center" bgcolor="bbffbb"
| 103 || July 25 || Orioles || 5 – 3 || Lidle (11-8) || Johnson (8-5) || Miller (2) || 17,095 || 53-50
|- align="center" bgcolor="ffbbbb"
| 104 || July 26 || Orioles || 7 – 2 || Hentgen (3-5) || Hendrickson (6-7) || || 23,168 || 53-51
|- align="center" bgcolor="bbffbb"
| 105 || July 27 || Orioles || 10 – 1 || Halladay (15-2) || López (3-6) || || 21,787 || 54-51
|- align="center" bgcolor="ffbbbb"
| 106 || July 29 || Devil Rays || 9 – 8 || Levine (3-5) || Miller (1-2) || Carter (17) || 21,007 || 54-52
|- align="center" bgcolor="ffbbbb"
| 107 || July 30 || Devil Rays || 5 – 3 || Zambrano (8-5) || Lidle (11-9) || Colomé (2) || 21,068 || 54-53
|- align="center" bgcolor="ffbbbb"
| 108 || July 31 || Devil Rays || 7 – 6 || Sosa (4-8) || Hendrickson (6-8) || Carter (18) || 29,544 || 54-54
|-

|- align="center" bgcolor="ffbbbb"
| 109 || August 1 || @ Angels || 5 – 0 || Ortiz (13-8) || Halladay (15-3) || || 42,635 || 54-55
|- align="center" bgcolor="bbffbb"
| 110 || August 2 || @ Angels || 6 – 1 || Thurman (1-0) || Washburn (8-11) || || 43,087 || 55-55
|- align="center" bgcolor="bbffbb"
| 111 || August 3 || @ Angels || 4 – 0 || Escobar (7-6) || Shields (2-2) || Politte (12) || 42,198 || 56-55
|- align="center" bgcolor="ffbbbb"
| 112 || August 4 || @ Devil Rays || 10 – 1 || Zambrano (9-5) || Lidle (11-10) || || 8,193 || 56-56
|- align="center" bgcolor="ffbbbb"
| 113 || August 5 || @ Devil Rays || 5 – 4 (10)|| Colomé (3-5) || Acevedo (1-5) || || 9,566 || 56-57
|- align="center" bgcolor="bbffbb"
| 114 || August 6 || @ Devil Rays || 7 – 3 || Halladay (16-3) || Kennedy (3-9) || || 9,430 || 57-57
|- align="center" bgcolor="ffbbbb"
| 115 || August 8 || Rangers || 5 – 3 || Dickey (6-5) || Thurman (1-1) || Cordero (7) || 24,392 || 57-58
|- align="center" bgcolor="bbffbb"
| 116 || August 9 || Rangers || 5 – 3 || Escobar (8-6) || Fultz (1-3) || López (3) || 24,644 || 58-58
|- align="center" bgcolor="ffbbbb"
| 117 || August 10 || Rangers || 5 – 4 || Lewis (5-7) || Towers (1-1) || Cordero (8) || 25,401 || 58-59
|- align="center" bgcolor="bbffbb"
| 118 || August 11 || @ Mariners || 5 – 3 || Hendrickson (7-8) || Piñeiro (13-7) || López (4) || 44,922 || 59-59
|- align="center" bgcolor="ffbbbb"
| 119 || August 12 || @ Mariners || 3 – 1 || García (10-12) || Halladay (16-4) || Hasegawa (11) || 37,018 || 59-60
|- align="center" bgcolor="ffbbbb"
| 120 || August 13 || @ Mariners || 13 – 6 || Mateo (3-0) || Kershner (0-2) || || 37,066 || 59-61
|- align="center" bgcolor="bbffbb"
| 121 || August 14 || @ Mariners || 5 – 2 || Escobar (9-6) || Meche (13-8) || López (5) || 41,945 || 60-61
|- align="center" bgcolor="bbffbb"
| 122 || August 15 || @ Athletics || 8 – 5 || Towers (2-1) || Harden (3-2) || Miller (3) || 17,446 || 61-61
|- align="center" bgcolor="ffbbbb"
| 123 || August 16 || @ Athletics || 6 – 4 || Hudson (12-4) || Hendrickson (7-9) || Foulke (30) || 31,045 || 61-62
|- align="center" bgcolor="ffbbbb"
| 124 || August 17 || @ Athletics || 7 – 3 || Zito (10-10) || Halladay (16-5) || Foulke (31) || 32,488 || 61-63
|- align="center" bgcolor="ffbbbb"
| 125 || August 19 || Mariners || 9 – 1 || Franklin (9-10) || Escobar (9-7) || || 24,025 || 61-64
|- align="center" bgcolor="bbffbb"
| 126 || August 20 || Mariners || 5 – 2 || Towers (3-1) || Meche (13-9) || || 21,588 || 62-64
|- align="center" bgcolor="bbffbb"
| 127 || August 21 || Mariners || 7 – 3 || Hendrickson (8-9) || Moyer (15-6) || || 20,111 || 63-64
|- align="center" bgcolor="bbffbb"
| 128 || August 22 || Athletics || 6 – 3 || Halladay (17-5) || Zito (10-11) || López (6) || 22,050 || 64-64
|- align="center" bgcolor="ffbbbb"
| 129 || August 23 || Athletics || 11 – 5 || Wood (1-0) || Sturtze (6-6) || || 27,740 || 64-65
|- align="center" bgcolor="ffbbbb"
| 130 || August 24 || Athletics || 17 – 2 || Hudson (13-4) || Escobar (9-8) || Neu (1) || 32,979 || 64-66
|- align="center" bgcolor="ffbbbb"
| 131 || August 25 || Athletics || 8 – 6 || Lilly (7-9) || Lidle (11-11) || Foulke (34) || 22,111 || 64-67
|- align="center" bgcolor="bbffbb"
| 132 || August 26 || @ Red Sox || 12 – 9 || Towers (4-1) || Sauerbeck (0-1) || López (7) || 33,731 || 65-67
|- align="center" bgcolor="ffbbbb"
| 133 || August 27 || @ Red Sox || 6 – 3 || Timlin (6-4) || Halladay (17-6) || Kim (11) || 34,206 || 65-68
|- align="center" bgcolor="bbffbb"
| 134 || August 29 || @ Indians || 7 – 3 || Escobar (10-8) || Sabathia (12-8) || || 21,008 || 66-68
|- align="center" bgcolor="bbffbb"
| 135 || August 30 || @ Indians || 9 – 3 || Lidle (12-11) || Westbrook (6-8) || Towers (1) || 21,806 || 67-68
|- align="center" bgcolor="ffbbbb"
| 136 || August 31 || @ Indians || 5 – 4 || Báez (1-7) || Kershner (0-3) || || 20,866 || 67-69
|-

|- align="center" bgcolor="bbffbb"
| 137 || September 1 || Yankees || 8 – 1 || Halladay (18-6) || Wells (12-6) || || 26,869 || 68-69
|- align="center" bgcolor="bbffbb"
| 138 || September 3 || Yankees || 4 – 3 || Kershner (1-3) || Osuna (2-5) || López (8) || 21,770 || 69-69
|- align="center" bgcolor="ffbbbb"
| 139 || September 4 || Yankees || 3 – 2 || Contreras (5-2) || Walker (1-2) || Rivera (32) || 17,254 || 69-70
|- align="center" bgcolor="bbffbb"
| 140 || September 5 || Tigers || 8 – 6 || Sturtze (7-6) || Maroth (6-20) || López (9) || 14,455 || 70-70
|- align="center" bgcolor="bbffbb"
| 141 || September 6 || Tigers || 1 – 0 (10)|| Halladay (19-6) || Rodney (0-2) || || 18,261 || 71-70
|- align="center" bgcolor="bbffbb"
| 142 || September 7 || Tigers || 8 – 0 || Towers (5-1) || Mears (0-2) || || 16,617 || 72-70
|- align="center" bgcolor="ffbbbb"
| 143 || September 8 || @ Yankees || 9 – 3 || Mussina (16-7) || Escobar (10-9) || || 8,848 || 72-71
|- align="center" bgcolor="ffbbbb"
| 144 || September 9 || @ Devil Rays || 11 – 6 || Waechter (3-0) || Lidle (12-12) || Kennedy (1) || 8,528 || 72-72
|- align="center" bgcolor="bbffbb"
| 145 || September 10 || @ Devil Rays || 6 – 5 || Hendrickson (9-9) || Sosa (5-10) || López (10) || 8,522 || 73-72
|- align="center" bgcolor="bbffbb"
| 146 || September 11 || @ Devil Rays || 3 – 1 || Halladay (20-6) || González (6-9) || || 9,345 || 74-72
|- align="center" bgcolor="bbffbb"
| 147 || September 12 || Orioles || 4 – 2 || Towers (6-1) || DuBose (2-5) || López (11) || 15,274 || 75-72
|- align="center" bgcolor="bbffbb"
| 148 || September 13 || Orioles || 6 – 1 || Escobar (11-9) || Hentgen (6-8) || || 18,309 || 76-72
|- align="center" bgcolor="ffbbbb"
| 149 || September 14 || Orioles || 5 – 3 || Riley (1-0) || Lidle (12-13) || Julio (33) || 18,763 || 76-73
|- align="center" bgcolor="bbffbb"
| 150 || September 16 || @ Tigers || 9 – 6 || Kershner (2-3) || Cornejo (6-16) || || 9,801 || 77-73
|- align="center" bgcolor="bbffbb"
| 151 || September 17 || @ Tigers || 6 – 0 || Halladay (21-6) || Loux (0-1) || || 11,240 || 78-73
|- align="center" bgcolor="bbffbb"
| 152 || September 18 || @ Tigers || 10 – 6 || Towers (7-1) || Maroth (7-21) || || 9,951 || 79-73
|- align="center" bgcolor="bbffbb"
| 153 || September 19 || @ Orioles || 5 – 2 || Escobar (12-9) || Carrasco (2-5) || López (12) || 25,857 || 80-73
|- align="center" bgcolor="ffbbbb"
| 154 || September 20 || @ Orioles || 2 – 1 || Ligtenberg (3-2) || Lidle (12-14) || Julio (35) || 32,381 || 80-74
|- align="center" bgcolor="bbffbb"
| 155 || September 21 || @ Orioles || 7 – 4 || Walker (2-2) || Carrasco (2-6) || López (13) || 27,502 || 81-74
|- align="center" bgcolor="ffbbbb"
| 156 || September 22 || Devil Rays || 5 – 2 || Bell (5-4) || Halladay (21-7) || || 22,869 || 81-75
|- align="center" bgcolor="bbffbb"
| 157 || September 23 || Devil Rays || 8 – 5 || Kershner (3-3) || Zambrano (11-10) || || 17,208 || 82-75
|- align="center" bgcolor="bbffbb"
| 158 || September 24 || Devil Rays || 5 – 3 || Escobar (13-9) || Waechter (3-2) || López (14) || 16,050 || 83-75
|- align="center" bgcolor="bbffbb"
| 159 || September 25 || Devil Rays || 10 – 8 || Miller (2-2) || Carter (7-5) || || 13,408 || 84-75
|- align="center" bgcolor="ffbbbb"
| 160 || September 26 || Indians || 2 – 1 || Stanford (1-3) || Lidle (12-15) || Riske (8) || 13,861 || 84-76
|- align="center" bgcolor="bbffbb"
| 161 || September 27 || Indians || 5 – 4 || Halladay (22-7) || Mulholland (3-4) || || 21,504 || 85-76
|- align="center" bgcolor="bbffbb"
| 162 || September 28 || Indians || 6 – 2 || Towers (8-1) || Lee (3-3) || || 22,014 || 86-76
|-

Player stats

Batting
Note: Pos = Position; G = Games played; AB = At bats; R = Runs; H = Hits; HR = Home runs; RBI = Runs batted in; Avg. = Batting average; SB = Stolen bases

Other batters
Note: G = Games played; AB = At bats; H = Hits; HR = Home runs; RBI = Runs batted in; Avg. = Batting average

Pitching

Starting pitchers
Note: G = Games; IP = Innings pitched; W = Wins; L = Losses; ERA = Earned run average; SO = Strikeouts

Other pitchers
Note: G = Games pitched; IP = Innings pitched; W = Wins; L = Losses; ERA = Earned run average; SO = Strikeouts

Relief pitchers
Note: G = Games pitched; IP = Innings pitched; W = Wins; L = Losses; SV = Saves; ERA = Earned run average; SO = Strikeouts

Award winners
 Carlos Delgado, 1B, Silver Slugger Award
Roy Halladay, Pitcher of the Month Award, May
Roy Halladay, Pitcher of the Month Award, September
 Roy Halladay, American League Cy Young Award
 Roy Halladay, The Sporting News Pitcher of the Year Award
 Vernon Wells, OF, Silver Slugger Award
All-Star Game
 Carlos Delgado, first base
 Roy Halladay, pitcher
 Vernon Wells, outfield

Farm system

References

External links
2003 Toronto Blue Jays at Baseball Reference
2003 Toronto Blue Jays at Baseball Almanac

Toronto Blue Jays seasons
2003 in Canadian sports
2003 in Toronto
Toronto Blue Jays